Lamoria surrufa is a species of snout moth. It is found in Cameroon and the Democratic Republic of Congo.

References

Moths described in 1964
Tirathabini
Insects of Cameroon
Insects of the Democratic Republic of the Congo
Moths of Africa